Arcadia is an unincorporated community in Spotsylvania County in the U.S. state of Virginia.

Transportation
Arcadia is located along the Jefferson Davis Highway (U.S. 1) at its intersection with Arcadia Drive (VA 603).

Historic sites
Beulah Church and Cemetery

Unincorporated communities in Spotsylvania County, Virginia
Unincorporated communities in Virginia